The 2007 NCAA Division I men's basketball tournament involved 65 teams playing in a single-elimination tournament to determine the national champion of men's NCAA Division I college basketball as a culmination of the 2006–07 basketball season. Team selections were announced on March 11, 2007, and the tournament began on March 13, 2007, with the Opening round game and concluded with the championship game on April 2 at the Georgia Dome in Atlanta, Georgia.

Both of the finalists from the year before returned to the Final Four as Florida, who returned its entire starting lineup from the year before, and UCLA advanced. They were joined in the Final Four by Ohio State, who was making its first appearance since their 1999 appearance (later vacated), and Georgetown, appearing for the first time since their national runner-up finish in 1985.

Florida successfully defended their title by defeating Ohio State in the championship 84–75. This marked the second time in 2007 that a Florida team beat an Ohio State team to win a national championship, as Florida's football team won the BCS National Championship Game over Ohio State in January. Florida's Corey Brewer was named the Most Outstanding Player. Florida became the first team to repeat since Duke in 1992. , the 2007 Gators are the last team to repeat as national champions.

This tournament was notable because it featured significantly fewer upsets than prior years. There were only 12 games in which a lower-seeded team defeated a higher-seeded team, and eight of these "upsets" were by teams ranked only one seed lower than their opponent. As of 2023, this is the last tournament in which no team seeded 12 or lower won a round of 64 game, while No. 7-seed UNLV was the lowest-seeded team to make it to the Sweet Sixteen. This marked the second time since the tournament expanded to at least 64 teams that no team seeded No. 8 or lower played in the Sweet Sixteen; the other instance was in 1995. Southland Conference champion Texas A&M-Corpus Christi made their first NCAA appearance.

This was the first Tournament since 2003 that regional sites were designated as "East", "West", "South", and "Midwest", rather than by the names of the host cities.

Tournament procedure
A total of 65 teams entered the tournament. Of that total, 30 of the teams earned automatic bids by winning their conference tournaments. The automatic bid of the Ivy League, which did not conduct a post-season tournament, went to its regular season champion, Penn. The remaining 34 teams were granted "at-large" bids, which are extended by the NCAA Selection Committee.

The initial game on March 13 officially named the Opening Round game, but popularly called the "play-in game", had Niagara, winner of the Mid-Atlantic Athletic Conference tournament, facing Florida A&M, who won the Mid-Eastern Athletic Conference tournament, for a chance to play top seed Kansas in the first round of the Tournament. Niagara defeated Florida A&M, 77–69, to advance to play Kansas.

All teams are seeded 1 to 16 within their regionals, while the Selection Committee seeded the entire field from 1 to 65.

Schedule and venues

The following are the sites that were selected to host each round of the 2007 tournament:

Opening Round
March 13
University of Dayton Arena, Dayton, Ohio (Host: University of Dayton)

First and Second Rounds
March 15 and 17
 HSBC Arena, Buffalo, New York (Hosts: Metro Atlantic Athletic Conference, Canisius College and Niagara University)
 ARCO Arena, Sacramento, California (Host: University of the Pacific)
 Rupp Arena, Lexington, Kentucky (Host: University of Kentucky)
 Lawrence Joel Veterans Memorial Coliseum, Winston-Salem, North Carolina (Host: Wake Forest University)
March 16 and 18
 United Center, Chicago, Illinois (Host: Big Ten Conference)
 Nationwide Arena, Columbus, Ohio (Host: Ohio State University)
 Spokane Veterans Memorial Arena, Spokane, Washington (Host: Washington State University)
 New Orleans Arena, New Orleans, Louisiana (Host: Tulane University)

Regional semifinals and finals (Sweet Sixteen and Elite Eight)
March 22 and 24
South Regional, Alamodome, San Antonio, Texas (Host: University of Texas at San Antonio)
West Regional, HP Pavilion at San Jose, San Jose, California (Host: San José State University)
March 23 and 25
East Regional, Continental Airlines Arena, East Rutherford, New Jersey (Host: Rutgers University)
Midwest Regional, Edward Jones Dome, St. Louis, Missouri (Host: Missouri Valley Conference)

National semifinals and championship (Final Four and championship)
March 31 and April 2
Georgia Dome, Atlanta, Georgia (Host: Georgia Institute of Technology)

Qualifying teams

Automatic bids
The following teams were automatic qualifiers for the 2007 NCAA field by virtue of winning their conference's tournament (except for the Ivy League, whose regular-season champion received the automatic bid).

Here are the top seeded teams in each regional and their overall seeds.
Midwest Regional (St. Louis) (top seed: Florida; top overall seed)
West Regional (San Jose) (top seed: Kansas; fourth overall seed)
East Regional (East Rutherford) (top seed: North Carolina; second overall seed)
South Regional (San Antonio) (top seed: Ohio State; third overall seed)

Listed by region and seeding

Bracket

(*) – Number of asterisks denotes number of overtimes.

Opening Round game – Dayton, Ohio
Winner advances to West Regional vs. No. (1) Kansas.

Midwest Regional – St. Louis, Missouri

West Regional – San Jose, California

East Regional – East Rutherford, New Jersey

South Regional – San Antonio, Texas

Final Four – Georgia Dome, Atlanta, Georgia

Game summaries
Unless otherwise specified, all games were on CBS, except for the play-in game, which aired on ESPN and two additional games. Those games were broadcast on CSTV except in the natural areas of the teams involved, as those were broadcast on CBS. Times listed are US EDT (UTC−4).

Team names are those listed on the NCAA's scoreboard for the play-in game and first-round matchups. Only UNLV and UCLA use abbreviations; all other names are unabbreviated except for the common abbreviation "A&M".

Opening rounds

First round upsets, close games, and other facts
The two major upsets of the first round were #11 Virginia Commonwealth's win over #6 Duke (West Regional), and #11 Winthrop's win over #6 Notre Dame (Midwest Regional). VCU beat Duke, 79–77, on a shot by Eric Maynor with 1.8 seconds left, sending Duke out for the first time in the first round since 1996. Winthrop's highly touted offense built a 21-point second-half lead before surviving a late Notre Dame rally to win, 74–64, earning their first tournament victory in school history. The only overtime game of the first round was in the South Regional, between #7 Nevada and #10 Creighton, ending 77–71 in favor of the Nevada Wolf Pack. Other close games included #3 Oregon squeaking by #14 Miami (Ohio), 58-56 (Midwest Regional), #5 Virginia Tech's win over #12 Illinois 54-52 (West Regional), and #9 Xavier's win over #8 BYU, 79-77 (South Regional). The highest score accumulated by a team in the 2007 tournament went to Tennessee's 121 points over Long Beach State (South Regional), which set a school record. This was the first year since 1993 that a #10 seed did not advance to the second round. It was also only the second time in the last 17 years that a #12 seed failed to advance against a #5 seed. #15 Texas A&M-Corpus Christi had leads of 10-0 and 25–7 in the first half against the #2 Wisconsin Badgers but Wisconsin prevailed 76–63.

Second round upsets, close games, and other facts
The two biggest upsets of the second round were #6 Vanderbilt's win over #3 Washington State (East Regional) and #7 UNLV's win over #2 Wisconsin (Midwest Regional). Vanderbilt won a heart-stopper, 78–74, in double overtime. UNLV won by six points, 74–68, in their biggest win since the 1990s. Other overtime games included #1 Ohio State's 78–71 win over #9 Xavier (South Regional) and #3 Pittsburgh's 84–79 overtime victory over #11 Virginia Commonwealth (West Regional). Ohio State's Ron Lewis hit a three-pointer with two seconds remaining to force overtime against Xavier, and Pittsburgh fought Virginia Commonwealth's comeback from 19 points down to come up with the victory. The Ohio State win over Xavier had a controversial ending as prior to Lewis's game-tying shot, Buckeye Greg Oden shoved a Xavier player, Justin Cage, in the back and onto the floor. Had an intentional foul been called, Xavier would have been awarded two foul shots and ball possession. Instead, a regular personal foul was called. Subsequently, Xavier missed the second free throw, allowing Lewis to shoot the game-tying 3. Other close games were #3 Texas A&M winning over #6 Louisville, 72-69 (South Regional); #5 Butler's victory over #4 Maryland, 62-59 (Midwest Regional); and #5 Tennessee defeating #4 Virginia, 77-74 (South Regional). This tournament marked the first time since 1995 that a double-digit seeded team did not advance to the Sweet 16 (Midwest #7 seed UNLV was the lowest team in the Sweet 16).

Regional semifinals (Sweet Sixteen) upsets, close games, other facts
No upsets or overtime games occurred in this round of the tournament, although there were several very close games. In the South Region, #2 Memphis barely defeated #3 Texas A&M as Aggie senior Acie Law, after a solid performance for most of the game, missed an open layup with under a minute left. A controversial clock situation with 3.1 seconds left added to the emotion. #1 Ohio State sneaked past #5 Tennessee, coming back from 20 points down to win, 85–84, with a blocked shot by Buckeye Greg Oden with 0.2 seconds left. In the East Region, #2 Georgetown won possibly the most controversial game of the tournament, beating #6 Vanderbilt, 66–65, on a shot by Jeff Green with 2.5 seconds left. The play was controversial as Green appeared to travel, despite fans and analysts claiming it was a clean drop step.

Regional Finals (Elite Eight)
The seeds of the Elite Eight teams were four #1s, three #2s, and one #3. This was the lowest combination of seeds in an Elite Eight since seeding began in the NCAA tournament.

South Regional Final

Although Ohio State star freshman Greg Oden got into early foul trouble, a close game at the half turned into a blowout as the Buckeyes went on a 20–8 run to win. Game leaders were Memphis' Jeremy Hunt with 26 points, and Robert Dozier with 11 rebounds. This ended Memphis' 25-game win streak, previously the longest in the nation.

West Regional Final

After a tight first-half, the Bruins slowly put away the top-seeded Jayhawks in the second-half using their 2006 national championship game experience, along with a strong defense. Shooting percentage was a key factor in the game as UCLA shot 53% to Kansas's 41%. UCLA's Arron Afflalo led all scorers with 24 points while Brandon Rush of Kansas led the Jayhawks with 18. UCLA and Kansas combined for 35 steals, breaking the previous tournament record of 28.

East Regional Final

North Carolina led for most of the game and the entire second half, but Georgetown rallied from ten points down with six minutes remaining to force overtime. The Tar Heels were outscored 15–3 in the extra session, missing 22 of their final 23 field goal attempts. Georgetown reached its first Final Four since 1985, when John Thompson III's father John Thompson (Jr.) was coach—and Thompson III became the first coach to succeed his father in coaching a team to the Final Four. With North Carolina's loss in the regional final, this marked the first time since the tournament field expanded to 64 teams that no ACC team made it to the Final Four for two consecutive years. The last time that no ACC team made it to the Final Four in consecutive years was in 1979 and 1980.

Midwest Regional Final

In what was actually a close game for most of regulation, Florida's three-point shots, along with a 20–9 run in the second half, amounted to a Gator win. Florida player Lee Humphrey led his team with seven three-pointers, and added up a total of 23 points. In one of the more odd moments of the tournament, Humphrey shot a three-pointer through the side of the net, causing a 10-minute delay as the net was repaired.

Final Four

All of the 2007 Final Four teams had participated in the 2006 tournament. Ohio State was knocked out in the second round by Georgetown, who would lose to Florida in the Minneapolis Regional semifinals. Florida would go on to defeat UCLA in the championship game. The four teams were all previous champions as well—Ohio State (1960), Georgetown (1984), UCLA (several), and Florida (2006)—marking the fourth time that all of the Final Four teams were past champions (joining 1993, 1995 and 1998 Final Fours). Also, it was the first time in nine years that no two Final Four teams were from the same conference.

South-East National semifinal
Ohio State proved to be too much for the Hoyas, even with Ohio State's phenom center Greg Oden sitting most of the game due to foul trouble.

Midwest-West National semifinal

In the beginning, Florida struggled with UCLA's swarming defense, but ten minutes into the game they took a double-digit lead, and Lee Humphrey, in a performance reminiscent of the previous year's national title game, blew the game open in the second half hitting three consecutive three-pointers. Humphrey's shots proved too much to overcome and UCLA never threatened in the second half.

National Championship

A rematch of a regular season meeting, won 86-60 by Florida in Gainesville, The Gators survived 25 points and 12 rebounds from Buckeyes center Greg Oden with stellar play from guards Lee Humphrey and Taurean Green with inside contributions coming from Al Horford (18 points) and tourney Most Outstanding Player Corey Brewer. Billy Donovan became the third-youngest coach (at age 41) to win two titles. Only Bob Knight (at Indiana) and San Francisco's Phil Woolpert both won two titles at the age of 40.

The Gators are the first team ever to hold the NCAA Division I college football and basketball titles in the same academic year (2006–07) and calendar year (2006 and 2007). Coincidentally, Florida also beat Ohio State (by a score of 41–14) in the College Football Championship, the first time in college sports history that identical matchups and results have occurred in both football and basketball championships. This was also the first time in NCAA D-I men's basketball history that exactly the same starting five were able to win back-to-back titles (Joakim Noah, Corey Brewer, Lee Humphrey, Al Horford, Taurean Green). Florida's Lee Humphrey also set the all-time NCAA Tournament record for three-point field goals made with 47. Humphrey surpassed Bobby Hurley's record of 42.

Record by conference

The America East, Atlantic Sun, Big Sky, Big West, Ivy, MEAC, Mid-American, Mid-Continent, Northeast, Ohio Valley, Patriot, Southern, Southland, Sun Belt, SWAC, and WCC all went 0–1.

* The MAAC went 1-1 since Niagara won the Play-in Game.

Media

Television

CBS Sports
For the 26th consecutive year, CBS Sports telecast the tournament, and for the 17th consecutive year, broadcast every game from the first round to the championship, with Jim Nantz and Billy Packer calling the Final Four. Nantz was in a stretch in which he would broadcast Super Bowl XLI, the Final Four, and The Masters golf tournament all in a 10-week period.

The complete list of announcing teams follows:
Jim Nantz, Billy Packer and Sam Ryan (she was only used as Sideline Reporter for the Final Four and NCAA Championship game) – First & Second Round at Chicago, Illinois; East Regional at East Rutherford, New Jersey; Final Four at Atlanta, Georgia
Dick Enberg and Jay Bilas – First & Second Round at Winston-Salem, North Carolina; West Regional at San Jose, California
Verne Lundquist and Bill Raftery – First & Second Round at New Orleans, Louisiana; South Regional at San Antonio, Texas
James Brown and Len Elmore – First & Second Round at Sacramento, California; Midwest Regional at St. Louis, Missouri
Gus Johnson and Dan Bonner – First & Second Round at Lexington, Kentucky
Ian Eagle and Jim Spanarkel – First & Second Round at Spokane, Washington
Kevin Harlan and Bob Wenzel – First & Second Round at Buffalo, New York
Tim Brando and Mike Gminski – First & Second Round at Columbus, Ohio

Greg Gumbel once again served as the studio host, joined by analysts Clark Kellogg and Seth Davis.

Other television
CSTV, owned by CBS, telecast the George Washington-Vanderbilt and the Virginia-Albany contests (in addition to the local CBS affiliates nearest to the participating teams in those games, and those using their digital subchannels for simulcasting). Those games served as the first-ever live tourney telecasts on CSTV, which also provided a highlights show after each day of competition. 

For the first three rounds of the tournament, games were also shown on DirecTV through the Mega March Madness pay-per-view service and on March Madness on Demand, a broadband Internet video streaming service that was a joint venture between CBS SportsLine (now known as CBSSports.com) and the NCAA.

The opening round game was broadcast on ESPN for the sixth consecutive year.

Radio
Westwood One once again had the live radio coverage. Kevin Harlan once again served as the play-by-play man at the Final Four with Bill Raftery and John Thompson on color. Thompson the elder is the father of current Georgetown coach John Thompson III.

Basketball courts
During the first- and second-round games in New Orleans, as part of the continuing recovery process from Hurricane Katrina, the NCAA allowed an additional floor decal recognizing the work of Habitat for Humanity's Collegiate Challenge and the NCAA Home Team program through the subregional's host institution, Tulane University. This marked the first time that a logo other than that of the NCAA or an NCAA member school has been allowed at an NCAA-sanctioned championship event. In addition, Tulane student athletes and athletic department personnel built a new house, valued at $75,000 (US), which was paid for by the NCAA and their corporate partner Lowe's, on Girod Street between the New Orleans Arena, site of the games, and the Louisiana Superdome, which has hosted four Final Fours.

Also, for the first time, custom-made, identical courts were used at all four regional sites in San Jose, St. Louis, San Antonio and East Rutherford. Starting in 2010, all tournament games would have the same identical courts.

See also 
 2007 NCAA Division II men's basketball tournament
 2007 NCAA Division III men's basketball tournament
 2007 NCAA Division I women's basketball tournament
 2007 NCAA Division II women's basketball tournament
 2007 NCAA Division III women's basketball tournament
 2007 National Invitation Tournament
 2007 Women's National Invitation Tournament
 2007 NAIA Division I men's basketball tournament
 2007 NAIA Division II men's basketball tournament
 2007 NAIA Division I women's basketball tournament
 2007 NAIA Division II women's basketball tournament
 Bracketology

References 

Ncaa
NCAA Division I men's basketball tournament
Basketball competitions in Atlanta
NCAA Division I men's basketball tournament
NCAA Division I men's basketball tournament
NCAA Division I men's basketball tournament
College basketball tournaments in Georgia (U.S. state)